The Jonathan Root House is a historic house at 140–142 North Main Street in Southington, Connecticut.  Built about 1720, it is believed to be the oldest surviving colonial building in the town.  It was listed on the National Register of Historic Places in 1989, and now houses professional offices.

Description and history
The Jonathan Root House is located north of the village center of Southington, on the west side of North Main Street at its junction with Mill Street.  It is a -story wood-frame structure, five bays wide, with a large central chimney and a center entrance.  The entrance is flanked by sidelight windows and topped by a gabled entablature.  It originally had a more steeply sloping rear roof, giving it a saltbox profile, but that was raised in the 20th century to provide for a larger second story.  Well-preserved interior elements include a period builtin cupboard.

The house's exact construction date is not known, but it was the residence of Jonathan Root, a prominent 18th-century resident, and is estimated to have been built around 1720. The town was first settled in the late 17th century, and Root (born 1707) married into the locally prominent Woodruff family.  When Southington was incorporated in 1779, the residents chose Root as one of the five first selectmen. At that same meeting, Root, along with Josiah Cowles, were appointed to a committee to "provide for the families of officers and soldiers in the field."  In 1774, Root was appointed to a committee to deliver provisions to Boston, in response to the British blockade of Boston harbor.  In addition to living here, Root also operated a tavern on the premises.

See also
National Register of Historic Places listings in Southington, Connecticut

References

Houses on the National Register of Historic Places in Connecticut
Houses completed in 1720
Houses in Southington, Connecticut
National Register of Historic Places in Hartford County, Connecticut
1720 establishments in Connecticut
Historic district contributing properties in Connecticut